Antony T. Jordan (born December 19, 1974) is a retired professional American football player who played linebacker for the Indianapolis Colts and Atlanta Falcons. He was also a member of the Tampa Bay Buccaneers.

Jordan played prep football at Washington Township High School in Washington Township, Gloucester County, New Jersey.

References

1974 births
Living people
People from Mantua Township, New Jersey
People from Washington Township, Gloucester County, New Jersey
Players of American football from New Jersey
Sportspeople from Gloucester County, New Jersey
American football linebackers
Vanderbilt Commodores football players
Indianapolis Colts players
Atlanta Falcons players
Tampa Bay Buccaneers players
Washington Township High School (New Jersey) alumni